Theodore J. "Ted" Daley (born March 15, 1966) is a Minnesota politician and a former member of the Minnesota Senate who represented District 38, which included most of Eagan and a small portion of Burnsville in Dakota County, which is in the southeastern Twin Cities metropolitan area. A Republican, he is a certified public accountant and a member of the United States Army Reserve.

Daley was first elected in 2010. He lost reelection in 2012 to Jim Carlson. He was a member of the Education, the Jobs and Economic Growth, and the State Government Innovation and Veterans committees. His special legislative concerns were education reform, an improved business climate, less government spending, and veterans affairs.

Daley graduated from Preston-Fountain High School in southeastern Minnesota, then went on to the United States Military Academy at West Point, New York, graduating in 1988 with a double language major in Russian and German and a minor in Engineering. He was assigned to Korea, then to the 101st Airborne Division, serving in Operation Desert Shield and Operation Desert Storm in 1990-1991 during the Gulf War. In 1996, after leaving active duty and joining the U.S. Army Reserve, he earned his M.B.A. from the University of St. Thomas in Saint Paul.

Daley returned to active military duty in 2001, serving until 2009. During this time, he was  deployed to Israel, serving in the Strategic Liaison Cell, to Cuba, serving as the U.S. European Command Liaison Officer, and to Iraq, serving as Senior Economics Advisor on the Provincial Reconstruction Team. When not actively deployed, he worked at Fort Snelling as the Chief of Joint Operations, an active duty military leadership position with U.S. Navy, U.S. Army, U.S. Air Force and U.S. National Guard members.

Active in his community, Daley served on the Eagan Planning Commission from 2009 to 2010, is Cubmaster for Boy Scouts Pack 446, and an active lector at his church. He has also coached soccer, basketball and track for the Eagan Athletic Association.

References

External links

Senator Ted Daley Web Page
Project Vote Smart - Senator Ted Daley Profile
Ted Daley Campaign Web Site

1966 births
Living people
People from Eagan, Minnesota
United States Military Academy alumni
Military personnel from Minnesota
University of St. Thomas (Minnesota) alumni
Republican Party Minnesota state senators
21st-century American politicians